For education in India, the District Institute for Education and Training (DIET) are district-level educational institutes which have been established in each district of India by the Indian government. They help in coordinating and implementing government policies at district level. About 3 million primary and elementary teachers need recurrent orientation to innovations in teaching and learning at the school level. The DIET has been charged with this responsibility.

Objectives

DIETs have been established as centres of guidance for educational institutes and schools of a district. They also work as a platform for research and experimental work in the educational domain. It also organizes programmes to train teachers in new innovation.

Departments

 PSTE (Pre-service Teacher Education)
 IFIC (In-service programmes Field interaction, Innovation and Co-ordination)
 DRU (District Resource Unit)
 P&M (Planning and Management)
 ET (Educational Technology)
 WE (Work Experience)
 CMDE (Curriculum Material Development and Evaluation)
 Administrative Branch

References

External links
 Website of Chunavadh, Sri Ganganagar District(Rajasthan) Diet
 Website of Kozhikode District Diet

Educational organisations based in India